The Royal Aircraft Factory F.E.6 was a two-bay, single-engine pusher biplane built by the British Royal Aircraft Factory, a larger version of their F.E.3.

Design and development
The F.E.6 was a larger version of their F.E.3. The aircraft was driven by a  Austro-Daimler/Beardmore engine, which drove a four-bladed propeller. The tail unit was on a single steel boom which projected aft through the propeller shaft. The biplane had ailerons on both upper and lower wings, with no wing stagger, while landing gear consisted of mainwheels on oleo struts with an auxiliary nosewheel. It was possibly armed with a 6-pound Davis recoilless weapon, or the Coventry Ordnance Works COW 37 mm gun. However, the aircraft was damaged upon landing during its first flight, and was subsequently not rebuilt.

Specifications

References

F.E.6